Kipampa is an administrative ward in Kigoma-Ujiji District of Kigoma Region in Tanzania. 
In 2016 the Tanzania National Bureau of Statistics report there were 8,714 people in the ward, from 7,917 in 2012.

Villages / neighborhoods 
The ward has 4 neighborhoods.
 Boiharo
 Kawawa
 Kazaroho
 Rutale

References

Wards of Kigoma Region